Weightlifting competitions at the 2023 Pan American Games in Santiago, Chile are scheduled to be held between October 21 and 24, 2023 at the Gimnasio Chimkowe. 

A total of 10 events (five per gender) will be contested, four less than in the last edition of the games. There was a merger of the respective events: 67kg and 73kg for men, 109kg and +109kg for men, 55kg and 59kg for women, 87kg and +87kg for women.

Qualification

A total of 136 weightlifters (68 per gender) will qualify to compete at the games. A nation may enter a maximum of 8 weightlifters (four per gender). The host nation (Chile) automatically qualified the maximum team size. All other nations will qualify through their team scores from both the 2021 and 2022 Pan American Championships combined. A further two wild cards will be awarded (one per gender). Extra spots were granted to the winners of the respective categories at the 2021 Junior Pan American Games.

Participating nations
A total of 6 countries qualified athletes so far. The number of weightlifters a nation has entered is in parentheses beside the name of the country.

Medalists

Men's events

Women's events

See also
Weightlifting at the 2024 Summer Olympics

References

Events at the 2023 Pan American Games
Pan American Games
2019